Campbell Lane (July 15, 1935 – January 30, 2014) was a Canadian actor who primarily did his work in Vancouver.  He appeared in many television shows produced there, and was also a voice over artist.

Death 
Campbell Lane died on January 30, 2014, from lung cancer, at the age of 78.

Filmography

Film roles 
 A Man, a Woman and a Bank (1979) - Citation Cop 
 Finders Keepers (1984) - Stanton-Gilmore
 Certain Fury (1985) - Wino
 The Journey of Natty Gann (1985) - Chicago Moderator
 Malone (1987) - Tom Riggs
 Beyond the Stars (1989) - Alex Stamas
 Cafe Romeo (1991) - Enzo
 Needful Things (1993) - Frank Jewett
 Cool Runnings (1993) - Shindler
 Look Who's Talking Now (1993) - Mollie's Dad
 Ski School 2 (1994) - Pastor
 Power Play (1994) - Harold Bloom
 The Final Cut (1995) - Kulkonne
 Mr. Magoo (1997) - (uncredited)
 Mr. Rice's Secret (1999) - Mr. Death
 The Duke (1999) - Nutswager
 MVP: Most Valuable Primate (2000) - Melvin
 3000 Miles to Graceland (2001) - Billy
 Along Came a Spider (2001) - Mathias
 Kevin of the North (2001) - Starter
 Dreamcatcher (2003) - Old Man Gosselin
 Scary Movie 4 (2006) - Amos
 Unnatural & Accidental (2006) - Rebecca's Father
 Gray Matters (2006) - Harry
 Stargate: Continuum (2008, Video) - Older man

Television roles 
 The X-Files (1994-1996) - Committee Chairman / Calusari Elder / Hohman's Father
 Nick Fury: Agent of S.H.I.E.L.D. (1998, TV Movie) - Baron Wolfgang von Strucker
 First Wave (2000, Episode: "Rubicon") - Uncle Harry
 Beyond Belief: Fact or Fiction (2002) - John August (segment "The Cigar Box")
Masters of Horror (2005) - Masurewicz
 His and Her Christmas (2005, TV Movie) - Harold Lane
 Home by Christmas (2006, TV Movie) - Max Stern
 Battlestar Galactica: Razor (2007, TV Movie) - Older Man

Voice roles 
 Adventures of Mowgli (1973) - Baloo (English version, narrator)
 Maison Ikkoku (1986 ,TV Series) - Mr. Ichinose
 The New Adventures of He-Man (1990-1991, TV Series) - Skeletor
 Mega Man: Upon a Star (1993, TV Series) - Mr. Kobayashi
 Animated Classic Showcase (1993, Film Roman's)
 Dazzle the Dinosaur (1994) - Mother Maiasaura (Narrator)
 Gundam Wing (1995-1996, TV Series) - Narrator
 Key the Metal Idol (1996-1997, TV Series) - Aoi / 'B'
 The Rainbow Fish (1997) - Barracuda / Dragonsaurus
 Stories From My Childhood (1998, TV Series)
 RoboCop: Alpha Commando (1998-1999, TV Series) - Alpha Prime (Narrator)
 Beast Wars (1998-1999, TV Series) - Rampage
 Fat Dog Mendoza (1998-2000) - Mr. Johnson
 Sherlock Holmes in the 22nd Century (1999-2001, TV Series) - The Sussex Vampire
 Action Man (2000-2001, TV Series) - Dr. X
 Frank Was a Monster Who Wanted to Dance (2001) - Narrator
 Ultimate Book of Spells (2001-2002, TV Series)
 X-Men: Evolution (2001-2003, TV Series) - Mastermind / Professor Thorton
 Beyond Belief: Fact or Fiction (Took over for Don LaFontaine in 2002, TV Series) - John August (segment "The Cigar Box") / Self - Announcer

Video game roles
 Transformers: Beast Wars Transmetals (1999) - Rampage
 Home world (1999) - Narrator
 Homeworld: Cataclysm (2000) - Narrator
 Frogger Beyond (2002) - Rainforest Elder
 Homeworld 2 (2003) - Narrator

References

External links

1930s births
2014 deaths
Canadian male voice actors
Deaths from lung cancer
Deaths from cancer in Canada